Euclid's Elements ( Stoikheîa) is a mathematical treatise consisting of 13 books attributed to the ancient Greek mathematician Euclid in Alexandria, Ptolemaic Egypt  300 BC. It is a collection of definitions, postulates, propositions (theorems and constructions), and mathematical proofs of the propositions. The books cover plane and solid Euclidean geometry, elementary number theory, and incommensurable lines. Elements is the oldest extant large-scale deductive treatment of mathematics. It has proven instrumental in the development of logic and modern science, and its logical rigor was not surpassed until the 19th century.

Euclid's Elements has been referred to as the most successful and influential textbook ever written. It was one of the very earliest mathematical works to be printed after the invention of the printing press and has been estimated to be second only to the Bible in the number of editions published since the first printing in 1482, the number reaching well over one thousand. For centuries, when the quadrivium was included in the curriculum of all university students, knowledge of at least part of Euclid's Elements was required of all students. Not until the 20th century, by which time its content was universally taught through other school textbooks, did it cease to be considered something all educated people had read.

History

Basis in earlier work

Scholars believe that the Elements is largely a compilation of propositions based on books by earlier Greek mathematicians.

Proclus (412–485 AD), a Greek mathematician who lived around seven centuries after Euclid, wrote in his commentary on the Elements: "Euclid, who put together the Elements, collecting many of Eudoxus' theorems, perfecting many of Theaetetus', and also bringing to irrefragable demonstration the things which were only somewhat loosely proved by his predecessors".

Pythagoras ( 570–495 BC) was probably the source for most of books I and II, Hippocrates of Chios ( 470–410 BC, not the better known Hippocrates of Kos) for book III, and Eudoxus of Cnidus ( 408–355 BC) for book V, while books IV, VI, XI, and XII probably came from other Pythagorean or Athenian mathematicians. The Elements may have been based on an earlier textbook by Hippocrates of Chios, who also may have originated the use of letters to refer to figures. Other similar works are also reported to have been written by Theudius of Magnesia, Leon, and Hermotimus of Colophon.

Transmission of the text
In the 4th century AD, Theon of Alexandria produced an edition of Euclid which was so widely used that it became the only surviving source until François Peyrard's 1808 discovery at the Vatican of a manuscript not derived from Theon's. This manuscript, the Heiberg manuscript, is from a Byzantine workshop around 900 and is the basis of modern editions. Papyrus Oxyrhynchus 29 is a tiny fragment of an even older manuscript, but only contains the statement of one proposition.

Although Euclid was known to Cicero, for instance, no record exists of the text having been translated into Latin prior to Boethius in the fifth or sixth century. The Arabs received the Elements from the Byzantines around 760; this version was translated into Arabic under Harun al Rashid ( 800). The Byzantine scholar Arethas commissioned the copying of one of the extant Greek manuscripts of Euclid in the late ninth century. Although known in Byzantium, the Elements was lost to Western Europe until about 1120, when the English monk Adelard of Bath translated it into Latin from an Arabic translation. A relatively recent discovery was made of a Greek-to-Latin translation from the 12th century at Palermo, Sicily. The name of the translator is not known other than he was an anonymous medical student from Salerno who was visiting Palermo in order to translate the Almagest to Latin. The Euclid manuscript is extant and quite complete.

 The first printed edition appeared in 1482 (based on Campanus of Novara's 1260 edition), and since then it has been translated into many languages and published in about a thousand different editions. Theon's Greek edition was recovered in 1533. In 1570, John Dee provided a widely respected "Mathematical Preface", along with copious notes and supplementary material, to the first English edition by Henry Billingsley.

Copies of the Greek text still exist, some of which can be found in the Vatican Library and the Bodleian Library in Oxford. The manuscripts available are of variable quality, and invariably incomplete. By careful analysis of the translations and originals, hypotheses have been made about the contents of the original text (copies of which are no longer available).

Ancient texts which refer to the Elements itself, and to other mathematical theories that were current at the time it was written, are also important in this process. Such analyses are conducted by J. L. Heiberg and Sir Thomas Little Heath in their editions of the text.

Also of importance are the scholia, or annotations to the text. These additions, which often distinguished themselves from the main text (depending on the manuscript), gradually accumulated over time as opinions varied upon what was worthy of explanation or further study.

Influence

The Elements is still considered a masterpiece in the application of logic to mathematics. In historical context, it has proven enormously influential in many areas of science. Scientists Nicolaus Copernicus, Johannes Kepler, Galileo Galilei, Albert Einstein and Sir Isaac Newton were all influenced by the Elements, and applied their knowledge of it to their work. Mathematicians and philosophers, such as Thomas Hobbes, Baruch Spinoza, Alfred North Whitehead, and Bertrand Russell, have attempted to create their own foundational "Elements" for their respective disciplines, by adopting the axiomatized deductive structures that Euclid's work introduced.

The austere beauty of Euclidean geometry has been seen by many in western culture as a glimpse of an otherworldly system of perfection and certainty. Abraham Lincoln kept a copy of Euclid in his saddlebag, and studied it late at night by lamplight; he related that he said to himself, "You never can make a lawyer if you do not understand what demonstrate means; and I left my situation in Springfield, went home to my father's house, and stayed there till I could give any proposition in the six books of Euclid at sight". Edna St. Vincent Millay wrote in her sonnet "Euclid alone has looked on Beauty bare", "O blinding hour, O holy, terrible day, When first the shaft into his vision shone Of light anatomized!". Albert Einstein recalled a copy of the Elements and a magnetic compass as two gifts that had a great influence on him as a boy, referring to the Euclid as the "holy little geometry book".

The success of the Elements is due primarily to its logical presentation of most of the mathematical knowledge available to Euclid. Much of the material is not original to him, although many of the proofs are his. However, Euclid's systematic development of his subject, from a small set of axioms to deep results, and the consistency of his approach throughout the Elements, encouraged its use as a textbook for about 2,000 years. The Elements still influences modern geometry books. Furthermore, its logical, axiomatic approach and rigorous proofs remain the cornerstone of mathematics.

In modern mathematics 
One of the most notable influences of Euclid on modern mathematics is the discussion of the parallel postulate. In Book I, Euclid lists five postulates, the fifth of which stipulates  If a line segment intersects two straight lines forming two interior angles on the same side that sum to less than two right angles, then the two lines, if extended indefinitely, meet on that side on which the angles sum to less than two right angles.

This postulate plagued mathematicians for centuries due to its apparent complexity compared with the other four postulates. Many attempts were made to prove the fifth postulate based on the other four, but they never succeeded. Eventually in 1829, mathematician Nikolai Lobachevsky published a description of acute geometry (or hyperbolic geometry), a geometry which assumed a different form of the parallel postulate. It is in fact possible to create a valid geometry without the fifth postulate entirely, or with different versions of the fifth postulate (elliptic geometry). If one takes the fifth postulate as a given, the result is Euclidean geometry.

Contents 
 Book 1 contains 5 postulates (including the infamous parallel postulate) and 5 common notions, and covers important topics of plane geometry such as the Pythagorean theorem, equality of angles and areas, parallelism, the sum of the angles in a triangle, and the construction of various geometric figures.
 Book 2 contains a number of lemmas concerning the equality of rectangles and squares, sometimes referred to as "geometric algebra", and concludes with a construction of the golden ratio and a way of constructing a square equal in area to any rectilineal plane figure.
 Book 3 deals with circles and their properties: finding the center, inscribed angles, tangents, the power of a point, Thales' theorem.
 Book 4 constructs the incircle and circumcircle of a triangle, as well as regular polygons with 4, 5, 6, and 15 sides.
 Book 5, on proportions of magnitudes, gives the highly sophisticated theory of proportion probably developed by Eudoxus, and proves properties such as "alternation" (if a : b :: c : d, then a : c :: b : d).
 Book 6 applies proportions to plane geometry, especially the construction and recognition of similar figures.
 Book 7 deals with elementary number theory: divisibility, prime numbers and their relation to composite numbers, Euclid's algorithm for finding the greatest common divisor, finding the least common multiple.
 Book 8 deals with the construction and existence of geometric sequences of integers.
 Book 9 applies the results of the preceding two books and gives the infinitude of prime numbers and the construction of all even perfect numbers.
 Book 10 proves the irrationality of the square roots of non-square integers (e.g. ) and classifies the square roots of incommensurable lines into thirteen disjoint categories. Euclid here introduces the term "irrational", which has a different meaning than the modern concept of irrational numbers. He also gives a formula to produce Pythagorean triples.
 Book 11 generalizes the results of book 6 to solid figures: perpendicularity, parallelism, volumes and similarity of parallelepipeds.
 Book 12 studies the volumes of cones, pyramids, and cylinders in detail by using the method of exhaustion, a precursor to integration, and shows, for example, that the volume of a cone is a third of the volume of the corresponding cylinder. It concludes by showing that the volume of a sphere is proportional to the cube of its radius (in modern language) by approximating its volume by a union of many pyramids.
 Book 13 constructs the five regular Platonic solids inscribed in a sphere and compares the ratios of their edges to the radius of the sphere.

Euclid's method and style of presentation

Euclid's axiomatic approach and constructive methods were widely influential.

Many of Euclid's propositions were constructive, demonstrating the existence of some figure by detailing the steps he used to construct the object using a compass and straightedge. His constructive approach appears even in his geometry's postulates, as the first and third postulates stating the existence of a line and circle are constructive. Instead of stating that lines and circles exist per his prior definitions, he states that it is possible to 'construct' a line and circle. It also appears that, for him to use a figure in one of his proofs, he needs to construct it in an earlier proposition. For example, he proves the Pythagorean theorem by first inscribing a square on the sides of a right triangle, but only after constructing a square on a given line one proposition earlier.

As was common in ancient mathematical texts, when a proposition needed proof in several different cases, Euclid often proved only one of them (often the most difficult), leaving the others to the reader. Later editors such as Theon often interpolated their own proofs of these cases.

Euclid's presentation was limited by the mathematical ideas and notations in common currency in his era, and this causes the treatment to seem awkward to the modern reader in some places. For example, there was no notion of an angle greater than two right angles, the number 1 was sometimes treated separately from other positive integers, and as multiplication was treated geometrically he did not use the product of more than 3 different numbers. The geometrical treatment of number theory may have been because the alternative would have been the extremely awkward Alexandrian system of numerals.

The presentation of each result is given in a stylized form, which, although not invented by Euclid, is recognized as typically classical. It has six different parts: First is the 'enunciation', which states the result in general terms (i.e., the statement of the proposition). Then comes the 'setting-out', which gives the figure and denotes particular geometrical objects by letters. Next comes the 'definition' or 'specification', which restates the enunciation in terms of the particular figure. Then the 'construction' or 'machinery' follows. Here, the original figure is extended to forward the proof. Then, the 'proof' itself follows. Finally, the 'conclusion' connects the proof to the enunciation by stating the specific conclusions drawn in the proof, in the general terms of the enunciation.

No indication is given of the method of reasoning that led to the result, although the Data does provide instruction about how to approach the types of problems encountered in the first four books of the Elements. Some scholars have tried to find fault in Euclid's use of figures in his proofs, accusing him of writing proofs that depended on the specific figures drawn rather than the general underlying logic, especially concerning Proposition II of Book I. However, Euclid's original proof of this proposition, is general, valid, and does not depend on the figure used as an example to illustrate one given configuration.

Criticism 
Euclid's list of axioms in the Elements was not exhaustive, but represented the principles that were the most important. His proofs often invoke axiomatic notions which were not originally presented in his list of axioms. Later editors have interpolated Euclid's implicit axiomatic assumptions in the list of formal axioms.

For example, in the first construction of Book 1, Euclid used a premise that was neither postulated nor proved: that two circles with centers at the distance of their radius will intersect in two points. Later, in the fourth construction, he used superposition (moving the triangles on top of each other) to prove that if two sides and their angles are equal, then they are congruent; during these considerations he uses some properties of superposition, but these properties are not described explicitly in the treatise. If superposition is to be considered a valid method of geometric proof, all of geometry would be full of such proofs. For example, propositions I.2 and I.3 can be proved trivially by using superposition.

Mathematician and historian W. W. Rouse Ball put the criticisms in perspective, remarking that "the fact that for two thousand years [the Elements] was the usual text-book on the subject raises a strong presumption that it is not unsuitable for that purpose."

Apocrypha 
It was not uncommon in ancient times to attribute to celebrated authors works that were not written by them. It is by these means that the apocryphal books XIV and XV of the Elements were sometimes included in the collection. The spurious Book XIV was probably written by Hypsicles on the basis of a treatise by Apollonius. The book continues Euclid's comparison of regular solids inscribed in spheres, with the chief result being that the ratio of the surfaces of the dodecahedron and icosahedron inscribed in the same sphere is the same as the ratio of their volumes, the ratio being

The spurious Book XV was probably written, at least in part, by Isidore of Miletus. This book covers topics such as counting the number of edges and solid angles in the regular solids, and finding the measure of dihedral angles of faces that meet at an edge.

Editions

1460s, Regiomontanus (incomplete)
1482, Erhard Ratdolt (Venice), first printed edition
1533, editio princeps by Simon Grynäus
1572, Commandinus Latin edition
1574, Christoph Clavius

Translations
1505,  (Latin)
1543, Niccolò Tartaglia (Italian)
1557, Jean Magnien and Pierre de Montdoré, reviewed by Stephanus Gracilis (Greek to Latin)
1558, Johann Scheubel (German)
1562, Jacob Kündig (German)
1562, Wilhelm Holtzmann (German)
1564–1566,  de Béziers (French)
1570, Henry Billingsley (English)
1572, Commandinus (Latin)
1575, Commandinus (Italian)
1576, Rodrigo de Zamorano (Spanish)
1594, Typographia Medicea (edition of the Arabic translation of The Recension of Euclid's "Elements"
1604,  de Bar-le-Duc (French)
1606, Jan Pieterszoon Dou (Dutch)
1607, Matteo Ricci, Xu Guangqi (Chinese)
1613, Pietro Cataldi (Italian)
1615, Denis Henrion (French)
1617, Frans van Schooten (Dutch)
1637, L. Carduchi (Spanish)
1639, Pierre Hérigone (French)
1651, Heinrich Hoffmann (German)
1651, Thomas Rudd (English)
1660, Isaac Barrow (English)
1661, John Leeke and Geo. Serle (English)
1663, Domenico Magni (Italian from Latin)
1672, Claude François Milliet Dechales (French)
1680, Vitale Giordano (Italian)
1685, William Halifax (English)
1689, Jacob Knesa (Spanish)
1690, Vincenzo Viviani (Italian)
1694, Ant. Ernst Burkh v. Pirckenstein (German)
1695, Claes Jansz Vooght (Dutch)
1697, Samuel Reyher (German)
1702, Hendrik Coets (Dutch)
1705, Charles Scarborough (English)
1708, John Keill (English)
1714, Chr. Schessler (German)
1714, W. Whiston (English)
1720s, Jagannatha Samrat (Sanskrit, based on the Arabic translation of Nasir al-Din al-Tusi)
1731, Guido Grandi (abbreviation to Italian)
1738, Ivan Satarov (Russian from French)
1744, Mårten Strömer (Swedish)
1749, Dechales (Italian)
1749, Methodios Anthrakitis (Μεθόδιος Ανθρακίτης) (Greek)
1745, Ernest Gottlieb Ziegenbalg (Danish)
1752, Leonardo Ximenes (Italian)
1756, Robert Simson (English)
1763, Pibo Steenstra (Dutch)
1768, Angelo Brunelli (Portuguese)
1773, 1781, J. F. Lorenz (German)
1780, Baruch Schick of Shklov (Hebrew)
1781, 1788 James Williamson (English)
1781, William Austin (English)
1789, Pr. Suvoroff nad Yos. Nikitin (Russian from Greek)
1795, John Playfair (English)
1803, H.C. Linderup (Danish)
1804, François Peyrard (French). Peyrard discovered in 1808 the Vaticanus Graecus 190, which enables him to provide a first definitive version in 1814–1818
1807, Józef Czech (Polish based on Greek, Latin and English editions)
1807, J. K. F. Hauff (German)
1818, Vincenzo Flauti (Italian)
1820, Benjamin of Lesbos (Modern Greek)
1826, George Phillips (English)
1828, Joh. Josh and Ign. Hoffmann (German)
1828, Dionysius Lardner (English)
1833, E. S. Unger (German)
1833, Thomas Perronet Thompson (English)
1836, H. Falk (Swedish)
1844, 1845, 1859, P. R. Bråkenhjelm (Swedish)
1850, F. A. A. Lundgren (Swedish)
1850, H. A. Witt and M. E. Areskong (Swedish)
1862, Isaac Todhunter (English)
1865, Sámuel Brassai (Hungarian)
1873, Masakuni Yamada (Japanese)
1880, Vachtchenko-Zakhartchenko (Russian)
1897, Thyra Eibe (Danish)
1901, Max Simon (German)
1907, František Servít (Czech)
1908, Thomas Little Heath (English)
1939, R. Catesby Taliaferro (English)
1953, 1958, 1975, Evangelos Stamatis (Ευάγγελος Σταµάτης) (Modern Greek) 
1999, Maja Hudoletnjak Grgić (Book I-VI) (Croatian)
2009, Irineu Bicudo (Portuguese)
2019, Ali Sinan Sertöz (Turkish)
2022, Ján Čižmár (Slovak)

Currently in print
Euclid's Elements – All thirteen books complete in one volume, Based on Heath's translation, Green Lion Press .
The Elements: Books I–XIII – Complete and Unabridged, (2006) Translated by Sir Thomas Heath, Barnes & Noble .
The Thirteen Books of Euclid's Elements, translation and commentaries by Heath, Thomas L. (1956) in three volumes. Dover Publications.  (vol. 1),  (vol. 2),  (vol. 3)

Free versions 
Euclid's Elements Redux, Volume 1, contains books I–III, based on John Casey's translation.
Euclid's Elements Redux, Volume 2, contains books IV–VIII, based on John Casey's translation.

References

Notes

Citations

Sources

Artmann, Benno: Euclid – The Creation of Mathematics. New York, Berlin, Heidelberg: Springer 1999, 

 Heath's authoritative translation plus extensive historical research and detailed commentary throughout the text.

External links 

Clark University Euclid's elements
Multilingual edition of Elementa in the Bibliotheca Polyglotta
 In HTML with Java-based interactive figures.
Richard Fitzpatrick's bilingual edition (freely downloadable PDF, typeset in a two-column format with the original Greek beside a modern English translation; also available in print as )
 [https://www.perseus.tufts.edu/hopper/text?doc=Euc.+1 Heath's English translation] (HTML, without the figures, public domain) (accessed February 4, 2010)
 Heath's English translation and commentary, with the figures (Google Books): vol. 1, vol. 2, vol. 3, vol. 3 c. 2
 Oliver Byrne's 1847 edition (also hosted at archive.org)– an unusual version by Oliver Byrne who used color rather than labels such as ABC (scanned page images, public domain)
 Web adapted version of Byrne’s Euclid designed by Nicholas Rougeux 
Video adaptation, animated and explained by Sandy Bultena, contains books I-VII. 
 The First Six Books of the Elements by John Casey and Euclid scanned by Project Gutenberg.
 [http://mysite.du.edu/~etuttle/classics/nugreek/contents.htm Reading Euclid] – a course in how to read Euclid in the original Greek, with English translations and commentaries (HTML with figures)
Sir Thomas More's manuscript
Latin translation by Aethelhard of Bath
[http://www.physics.ntua.gr/~mourmouras/euclid/index.html Euclid Elements – The original Greek text] Greek HTML
Clay Mathematics Institute Historical Archive – The thirteen books of Euclid's Elements copied by Stephen the Clerk for Arethas of Patras, in Constantinople in 888 AD
Kitāb Taḥrīr uṣūl li-Ūqlīdis Arabic translation of the thirteen books of Euclid's Elements by Nasīr al-Dīn al-Ṭūsī. Published by Medici Oriental Press(also, Typographia Medicea). Facsimile hosted by Islamic Heritage Project.
Euclid's Elements Redux, an open textbook based on the Elements
1607 Chinese translations reprinted as part of Siku Quanshu, or "Complete Library of the Four Treasuries."

3rd-century BC books

Mathematics textbooks
Ancient Greek mathematical works
Works by Euclid
History of geometry
Foundations of geometry
Geometry education